Taurus Tremani Bartlett (born January 6, 1999), known professionally as Polo G, is an American rapper. He rose to prominence with his singles "Finer Things" and "Pop Out" (featuring Lil Tjay). His debut album Die a Legend (2019) peaked at number six on the US Billboard 200 and was certified platinum by the RIAA.

Bartlett's second studio album, The Goat (2020), peaked at number two on the Billboard 200 and charted ten singles on the Billboard Hot 100 chart. His mainstream success continued with his third studio album Hall of Fame (2021), which became Bartlett's first chart topping album and included his first number-one single "Rapstar".

Early life
Taurus Tremani Bartlett was born on January 6, 1999, and raised in the Marshall Field Garden Apartments, located in the Old Town neighborhood on the north side of Chicago, Illinois, to Taurus Bartlett and Stacia Mac. Mac, a former property manager, serves as Bartlett's manager.  He is the second of four children, having an older sister, a younger brother, Taurean, who's also a rapper under the stage name Trench Baby, and a younger sister. After graduating high school, Bartlett was accepted to Lincoln University with a broadcasting major, but decided not to go on his first day, opting to pursue a music career full-time. He is affiliated with the Chicago-based gang Mickey Cobras, which is known to feud with gangs like the Gangster Disciples.

Career

2018–2019: Beginnings, record deal, and Die a Legend
Bartlett's first song ever recorded was titled "ODA", which he released to YouTube. Upon creating a SoundCloud account in 2018, he released the track "Gang with Me", which quickly racked up millions of plays. He continued gaining traction with his songs "Welcome Back" and "Neva Cared". Bartlett went on to release "Finer Things", a song he wrote while incarcerated, in the latter half of 2018 and quickly gained millions of views. In early 2019, Bartlett released "Pop Out" featuring Lil Tjay which peaked at number 11 on the Billboard Hot 100. The song's music video gained over 200 million views on YouTube and led to him signing a record deal with Columbia Records. Bartlett also released videos for his songs "Deep Wounds", "Through da Storm", "Effortless", and "Dyin' Breed" from his debut studio album Die a Legend, which was released on June 7, 2019, and peaked at number 6 on the Billboard 200. "Heartless", a single released later in 2019, featured production from Mustard, and was later featured on his second album.

2020–present: The Goat, Hall of Fame, and Only Dreamers Achieve Records
On February 14, 2020, Bartlett released the track "Go Stupid", with rappers Stunna 4 Vegas and NLE Choppa with featured production from Mike Will Made It and co-production from Tay Keith. "Go Stupid" became his second song on the Hot 100 (after "Pop Out"), peaking at number 60. Bartlett then released his second studio album, The Goat, on May 15, 2020. The album debuted at number two on the Billboard 200 and ten songs from the album hit the Hot 100, including "Flex" featuring Juice Wrld and "Be Something" featuring Lil Baby, peaking at numbers 30 and 57, respectively. The same month, he was featured alongside Lil Baby on "3 Headed Goat" by Lil Durk which peaked at number 43 on the Billboard Hot 100. In July, Bartlett was featured on Juice Wrld's posthumous album Legends Never Die on the song "Hate the Other Side". The song peaked at number 10 on the Billboard Hot 100, his first top-ten single and highest charting overall song. On August 11, 2020, he was included on XXLs 2020 Freshman Class. Later that month, he released the music video for his single "Martin & Gina", which peaked at number 61 on the Billboard Hot 100. In September, he released the single "Epidemic", which peaked at 47 on the Billboard Hot 100. On October 30, 2020, he was featured on "The Code" by King Von off his debut album Welcome to O'Block. The song peaked at number 66 on the Billboard Hot 100 and charted in Canada.

In September, Bartlett announced his own record label, Only Dreamers Achieve (ODA), with Syracuse-based artist Scorey being his first signee.

Bartlett was honored in the 2021 Forbes 30 Under 30 listing, under the music category.

On February 5, 2021, he released the single "GNF (OKOKOK)". On February 12, he was featured on the soundtrack for the film Judas and the Black Messiah, on the song "Last Man Standing". On March 5, Bartlett was also featured on the soundtrack for the 2021 film Boogie on the song "Fashion" by late rapper Pop Smoke. Bartlett collaborated with Lil Tjay and Fivio Foreign on the song "Headshot", released on March 19. His song "Rapstar", released on April 9, 2021, debuted at the number-one spot on the Billboard Hot 100. On May 17, he announced that he finished recording his third studio album Hall of Fame. He released the album's fourth single "Gang Gang" with Lil Wayne on May 21, with the song peaking at 33 on the Hot 100. On June 11, Bartlett released Hall of Fame, which debuted at number one on the US Billboard 200 and became his first number-one album. He released Hall of Fame 2.0, a deluxe edition of the album, on December 3, 2021. The album featured fourteen new songs in addition to the previous twenty, and contained guest appearances from Lil Baby, Moneybagg Yo, YungLiV, NLE Choppa, and Lil Tjay.

Artistry
Polo G was originally known for his Chicago drill sound, but eventually transitioned to a more melodic style. He has been noted for his "vivid and explicit storytelling"; his lyrics often involve tough subjects, including racism and mental health. He has stated that American rappers Lil Wayne and Tupac Shakur are his biggest influences. He also grew up listening to Gucci Mane, as well as Chicago rappers Lil Durk and G Herbo.

Personal life
Bartlett has a son, born on July 6, 2019.

Bartlett was hospitalized on August 12, 2019, due to a near-fatal drug overdose at a party. Due to his aforementioned hospitalization and the death of fellow rapper and friend Juice Wrld, he has since quit Ecstasy and Xanax.

Discography

 Die a Legend (2019)
 The Goat (2020)
 Hall of Fame (2021)
 Hall of Fame 2.0 (2021)

Filmography

Awards and nominations

References

External links

1999 births
Living people
21st-century African-American male singers
21st-century American rappers
African-American male rappers
African-American male singer-songwriters
American hip hop singers
Columbia Records artists
Drill musicians
Midwest hip hop musicians
Rappers from Chicago
Singers from Chicago
Singer-songwriters from Illinois
Trap musicians